Michael Poultney (born 10 July 1950) is a New Zealand cricketer. He played in one first-class matches for Northern Districts in 1972/73.

See also
 List of Northern Districts representative cricketers

References

External links
 

1950 births
Living people
New Zealand cricketers
Northern Districts cricketers
Cricketers from Hamilton, New Zealand